The 2018–19 Chicago Bulls season was the 53rd season of the franchise in the National Basketball Association (NBA).

On December 3, 2018, the Bulls fired Fred Hoiberg and replaced him with his assistant Jim Boylen.

This season also produced the Bulls' highest-scoring game in franchise history, recording 168 points on March 1, 2019 in a quadruple overtime 168–161 win over the Atlanta Hawks. It broke a team record previously set in the 1983–84 season. It was also the third-highest scoring game in NBA history, as well as the third game where both teams scoring broke through the 160 point barrier in the same game.

Draft picks

Roster

Standings

Division

Conference

Game log

Preseason

|- style="background:#bfb;"
| 1
| September 30
| New Orleans
| 
| Blakeney, LaVine, Portis (21)
| Dunn, Parker (8)
| Payne (7)
| United Center17,861
| 1–0
|- style="background:#fcc;"
| 2
| October 3
| @ Milwaukee
| 
| Portis (17)
| Blakeney (8)
| Blakeney (6)
| Fiserv Forum15,107
| 1–1
|- style="background:#fcc;"
| 3
| October 8
| @ Charlotte
| 
| LaVine (26)
| Parker (11)
| Carter Jr. (5)
| Spectrum Center8,487
| 1–2
|- style="background:#bfb;"
| 4
| October 10
| Indiana
| 
| LaVine, Holiday (22)
| Portis, Parker, Payne (6)
| Dunn (7)
| United Center17,162
| 2–2
|- style="background:#fcc;"
| 5
| October 12
| Denver
| 
| Parker (19)
| Carter Jr. (9)
| Blakeney (5)
| United Center18,973
| 2–3

Regular season

|- style="background:#fcc
| 1
| October 18
| @ Philadelphia
| 108–127
| Zach LaVine (30)
| Bobby Portis (11)
| Ryan Arcidiacono (8)
| Wells Fargo Center20,302
| 0–1
|- style="background:#fcc
| 2
| October 20
| Detroit
| 116–118
| Zach LaVine (33)
| Bobby Portis (14)
| Ryan Arcidiacono (7)
| United Center21,289
| 0–2
|- style="background:#fcc
| 3
| October 22
| @ Dallas
| 109–115
| Zach LaVine (34)
| Wendell Carter Jr. (9)
| Kris Dunn (7)
| American Airlines Center19,291
| 0–3
|- style="background:#cfc
| 4
| October 24
| Charlotte
| 112–110
| Zach LaVine (32)
| Jabari Parker (9)
| Zach LaVine (5)
| United Center19,170
| 1–3
|- style="background:#fcc
| 5
| October 26
| @ Charlotte
| 106–135
| Zach LaVine (20)
| Hutchison, Felicio (7)
| LaVine, Arcidiacono (4)
| Spectrum Center15,220
| 1–4
|- style="background:#cfc
| 6
| October 27
| @ Atlanta
| 97–85
| Zach LaVine (27)
| Zach LaVine (11)
| Ryan Arcidiacono (7)
| State Farm Arena15,549
| 2–4
|- style="background:#fcc
| 7
| October 29
| Golden State
| 124–149
| LaVine, Blakeney (21)
| Jabari Parker (9)
| Jabari Parker (6)
| United Center21,076
| 2–5
|- style="background:#fcc
| 8
| October 31
| Denver
| 107–108 (OT)
| Zach LaVine (28)
| Jabari Parker (9)
| LaVine, Blakeney (7)
| United Center19,027
| 2–6

|- style="background:#fcc
| 9
| November 2
| Indiana
| 105–107
| Antonio Blakeney (22)
| Cristiano Felicio (9)
| Cameron Payne (8)
| United Center19,704
| 2–7
|- style="background:#fcc
| 10
| November 3
| Houston
| 88–96
| Zach LaVine (21)
| Wendell Carter Jr. (13)
| LaVine, Blakeney (4)
| United Center20,505
| 2–8
|- style="background:#cfc
| 11
| November 5
| @ New York
| 116–115 (2OT)
| Zach LaVine (41)
| Wendell Carter Jr. (13)
| Zach LaVine (4)
| Madison Square Garden19,812
| 3–8
|- style="background:#fcc
| 12
| November 7
| @ New Orleans
| 98–107
| Zach LaVine (22)
| Jabari Parker (13)
| Zach LaVine (4)
| Smoothie King Center15,514
| 3–9
|- style="background:#cfc
| 13
| November 10
| Cleveland
| 99–98
| Zach LaVine (24)
| Justin Holiday (7)
| Zach LaVine (5)
| United Center21,506
| 4–9
|- style="background:#fcc
| 14
| November 12
| Dallas
| 98–103
| Zach LaVine (26)
| Wendell Carter Jr. (10)
| Ryan Arcidiacono (6)
| United Center19,012
| 4–10
|- style="background:#fcc
| 15
| November 14
| @ Boston
| 82–111
| Shaquille Harrison (16)
| Zach LaVine (9)
| Holiday, LaVine (4)
| TD Garden18,624
| 4–11
|- style="background:#fcc
| 16
| November 16
| @ Milwaukee
| 104–123
| Jabari Parker (21)
| Jabari Parker (8)
| Holiday, LaVine, Carter Jr. (4)
| Fiserv Forum17,341
| 4–12
|- style="background:#fcc
| 17
| November 17
| Toronto
| 83–122
| Antonio Blakeney (13)
| Jabari Parker (6)
| Shaquille Harrison (6)
| United Center21,263
| 4–13
|- style="background:#cfc
| 18
| November 21
| Phoenix
|124–116
|Zach LaVine (29)
|Jabari Parker (13)
|Jabari Parker (8)
| United Center19,014
|5–13
|- style="background:#fcc
| 19
| November 23
| Miami
| 96–103
|Justin Holiday (27)
|Justin Holiday (13)
|Zach LaVine (9)
| United Center20,935
| 5–14
|-style="background:#fcc
| 20
| November 24
| @ Minnesota
|96–111
|Zach LaVine (28)
|Justin Holiday (11)
|Justin Holiday (5)
| Target Center17,119
|5–15
|- style="background:#fcc
| 21
| November 26
| San Antonio
|107–108
|Zach LaVine (28)
|Jabari Parker (10)
|Zach LaVine (7)
| United Center19,006
|5–16
|- style="background:#fcc
| 22
| November 28
| @ Milwaukee
|113–116
|LaVine, Parker (24)
|Zach LaVine (9)
|Zach LaVine (7)
| Fiserv Forum16,660
|5–17
|- style="background:#fcc
| 23
| November 30
| @ Detroit
| 88–107
|Wendell Carter Jr. (28)
|Wendell Carter Jr. (7)
|Justin Holiday (7)
| Little Caesars Arena15,372
| 5–18

|- style="background:#fcc
| 24
| December 1
| @ Houston
| 105–121
| Zach LaVine (29)
| Jabari Parker (12)
| Cameron Payne (6)
| Toyota Center18,055
| 5–19
|- style="background:#fcc
| 25
| December 4
| @ Indiana
| 90–96
| Lauri Markkanen (21)
| Wendell Carter Jr. (13)
| Zach LaVine (9)
| Bankers Life Fieldhouse16,446
| 5–20
|- style="background:#cfc
| 26
| December 7
| Oklahoma City
| 114–112
| Zach LaVine (25)
| Markkanen, Parker (7)
| Zach LaVine (7)
| United Center19,842
| 6–20
|- style="background:#fcc
| 27
| December 8
| Boston
| 77–133
| Shaquille Harrison (20)
| Cristiano Felicio (7)
| Arcidiacono, Parker, Payne (3)
| United Center20,923
| 6–21
|- style="background:#fcc
| 28
| December 10
| Sacramento
| 89–108
| Zach LaVine (19)
| Portis, Carter Jr. (8)
| Kris Dunn (6)
| United Center18,164
| 6–22
|- style="background:#fcc
| 29
| December 13
| @ Orlando
| 91–97
| Zach LaVine (23)
| Bobby Portis (7)
| Arcidiacono, LaVine (5)
| Mexico City Arena20,201
| 6–23
|- style="background:#cfc
| 30
| December 15
| @ San Antonio
| 98–93
| Kris Dunn (24)
| Markkanen, Dunn, Holiday (7)
| Ryan Arcidiacono (6)
| AT&T Center18,354
| 7–23
|- style="background:#fcc
| 31
| December 17
| @ Oklahoma City
| 96–121
| Lauri Markkanen (16)
| Lauri Markkanen (15)
| Kris Dunn (7)
| Chesapeake Energy Arena18,203
| 7–24
|- style="background:#fcc
| 32
| December 19
| Brooklyn
| 93–96
| Kris Dunn (24)
| Bobby Portis (11)
| Kris Dunn (6)
| United Center18,065
| 7–25
|- style="background:#cfc
| 33
| December 21
| Orlando
| 90–80
| Lauri Markkanen (32)
| Justin Holiday (10)
| Ryan Arcidiacono (8)
| United Center20,436
| 8–25
|- style="background:#cfc
| 34
| December 23
| @ Cleveland
| 112–92
| Lauri Markkanen (31)
| Kris Dunn (8)
| Ryan Arcidiacono (8)
| Quicken Loans Arena19,432
| 9–25
|- style="background:#fcc
| 35
| December 26
| Minnesota
| 94–119
| Zach LaVine (28)
| Lopez, Carter Jr. (9)
| Kris Dunn (7)
| United Center21,852
| 9–26
|- style="background:#cfc
| 36
| December 28
| @ Washington
| 101–92
| Zach LaVine (24)
| Lauri Markkanen (14)
| Kris Dunn (8)
| Capital One Arena20,409
| 10–26
|- style="background:#fcc
| 37
| December 30
| @ Toronto
| 89–95
| Lauri Markkanen (18)
| Wendell Carter Jr. (11)
| Kris Dunn (8)
| Scotiabank Arena19,800
| 10–27

|- style="background:#fcc
| 38
| January 2
| Orlando
| 84–112
| Zach LaVine (16)
| Lauri Markkanen (6)
| Kris Dunn (4)
| United Center19,013
| 10–28
|- style="background:#fcc
| 39
| January 4
| Indiana
| 116–119 (OT)
| Zach LaVine (31)
| Lauri Markkanen (9)
| Kris Dunn (17)
| United Center21,284
| 10–29
|- style="background:#fcc
| 40
| January 6
| Brooklyn
| 100–117
| Zach LaVine (27)
| Wendell Carter Jr. (8)
| Kris Dunn (7)
| United Center19,265
| 10–30
|- style="background:#fcc
| 41
| January 9
| @ Portland
| 112–124
| Wendell Carter Jr. (22)
| Chandler Hutchison (8)
| Kris Dunn (7)
| Moda Center19,393
| 10–31
|- style="background:#fcc
| 42
| January 11
| @ Golden State
| 109–146
| Zach LaVine (29)
| Chandler Hutchison (6)
| Kris Dunn (5)
| Oracle Arena19,596
| 10–32
|- style="background:#fcc
| 43
| January 12
| @ Utah
| 102–110
| Zach LaVine (21)
| Wendell Carter Jr. (9)
| Kris Dunn (8)
| Vivint Smart Home Arena18,306
| 10–33
|- style="background:#fcc
| 44
| January 15
| @ LA Lakers
| 100–107
| Jabari Parker (18)
| Wendell Carter Jr. (10)
| Zach LaVine (8)
| Staples Center18,997
| 10–34
|- style="background:#fcc
| 45
| January 17
| @ Denver
| 105–135
| Lauri Markkanen (27)
| Bobby Portis (13)
| Zach LaVine (6)
| Pepsi Center17,289
| 10–35
|- style="background:#fcc
| 46
| January 19
| Miami
| 103–117
| Zach LaVine (22)
| Lauri Markkanen (9)
| Zach LaVine (6)
| United Center20,926
| 10–36
|- style="background:#cfc
| 47
| January 21
| @ Cleveland
| 104–88
| Zach LaVine (25)
| Lopez, Hutchison (9)
| Kris Dunn (9)
| Quicken Loans Arena19,432
| 11–36
|- style="background:#fcc
| 48
| January 23
| Atlanta
| 101–121
| Zach LaVine (23)
| Portis, Hutchison (7)
| Zach LaVine (4)
| United Center18,223
| 11–37
|- style="background:#fcc
| 49
| January 25
| LA Clippers
| 101–106
| Zach LaVine (29)
| Bobby Portis (14)
| Kris Dunn (10)
| United Center19,354
| 11–38
|- style="background:#fcc
| 50
| January 27
| Cleveland
| 101–104
| Lauri Markkanen (21)
| Lauri Markkanen (15)
| Kris Dunn (7)
| United Center19,675
| 11–39
|- style="background:#fcc
| 51
| January 29
| @ Brooklyn
| 117–122
| Zach LaVine (26)
| Lauri Markkanen (19)
| Zach LaVine (5)
| Barclays Center12,726
| 11–40
|- style="background:#cfc
| 52
| January 30
| @ Miami
| 105–89
| Bobby Portis (26)
| Lauri Markkanen (13)
| Dunn, Selden (8)
| American Airlines Arena19,600
| 12–40

|- style="background:#fcc
| 53
| February 2
| @ Charlotte
| 118–125
| Lauri Markkanen (30)
| Markkanen, Portis (9)
| Ryan Arcidiacono (6)
| Spectrum Center19,114
| 12–41
|- style="background:#fcc
| 54
| February 6
| New Orleans
| 120–125
| Lauri Markkanen (30)
| Lauri Markkanen (10)
| Kris Dunn (8)
| United Center18,116
| 12–42
|- style="background:#cfc
| 55
| February 8
| @ Brooklyn
| 125–106
| Lauri Markkanen (31)
| Lauri Markkanen (18)
| Kris Dunn (9)
| Barclays Center15,267
| 13–42
|- style="background:#fcc
| 56
| February 9
| Washington
| 125–134
| Zach LaVine (26)
| Lauri Markkanen (11)
| Kris Dunn (8)
| United Center19,942
| 13–43
|- style="background:#fcc
| 57
| February 11
| Milwaukee
| 99–112
| Zach LaVine (27)
| Lauri Markkanen (17)
| Zach LaVine (7)
| United Center18,833
| 13–44
|- style="background:#cfc
| 58
| February 13
| Memphis
| 122–110
| Otto Porter Jr. (37)
| Markkanen, Porter Jr. (10)
| Ryan Arcidiacono (11)
| United Center19,114
| 14–44
|- style="background:#cfc
| 59
| February 22
| @ Orlando
| 110–109
| Lauri Markkanen (25)
| Lauri Markkanen (11)
| Zach LaVine (6)
| Amway Center18,846
| 15–44
|- style="background:#cfc
| 60
| February 23
| Boston
| 126–116
| Zach LaVine (42)
| Lauri Markkanen (15)
| Kris Dunn (5)
| United Center21,295
| 16–44
|- style="background:#fcc
| 61
| February 25
| Milwaukee
| 106–117
| Lopez, Markkanen (26)
| Lauri Markkanen (12)
| Zach LaVine (9)
| United Center20,936
| 16–45
|- style="background:#cfc
| 62
| February 27
| @ Memphis
| 109–107
| Zach LaVine (30)
| Lauri Markkanen (10)
| Dunn, LaVine (4)
| FedExForum13,711
| 17–45

|- style="background:#cfc
| 63
| March 1
| @ Atlanta
| 168–161 (4OT)
| Zach LaVine (47)
| Lauri Markkanen (17)
| Zach LaVine (9)
| State Farm Arena15,267
| 18–45
|- style="background:#fcc
| 64
| March 3
| Atlanta
| 118–123
| Lauri Markkanen (19)
| Lauri Markkanen (9)
| Kris Dunn (6)
| United Center20,526
| 18–46
|- style="background:#fcc
| 65
| March 5
| @ Indiana
| 96–105
| Zach LaVine (27)
| Lauri Markkanen (13)
| Kris Dunn (5)
| Bankers Life Fieldhouse15,753
| 18–47
|- style="background:#cfc
| 66
| March 6
| Philadelphia
| 108–107
| Zach LaVine (39)
| Lopez, Porter Jr. (9)
| Dunn, LaVine (4)
| United Center19,927
| 19–47
|- style="background:#fcc
| 67
| March 8
| Detroit
| 104–112
| Zach LaVine (24)
| Kris Dunn (7)
| Otto Porter Jr. (8)
| United Center21,048
| 19–48
|- style="background:#fcc
| 68
| March 10
| @ Detroit
| 108–131
| Wayne Selden (18)
| Cristiano Felício (7)
| Shaquille Harrison (7)
| Little Caesars Arena19,356
| 19–49
|- style="background:#fcc
| 69
| March 12
| LA Lakers
| 107–123
| Robin Lopez (20)
| Otto Porter Jr. (9)
| Kris Dunn (9)
| United Center21,359
| 19–50
|- style="background:#fcc
| 70
| March 15
| @ LA Clippers
| 121–128
| Zach LaVine (31)
| Lauri Markkanen (8)
| Zach LaVine (7)
| Staples Center17,404
| 19–51
|- style="background:#fcc
| 71
| March 17
| @ Sacramento
| 102–129
| Zach LaVine (18)
| Cristiano Felicio (10)
| Shaquille Harrison (7)
| Golden 1 Center17,583
| 19–52
|- style="background:#cfc
| 72
| March 18
| @ Phoenix
| 116–101
| Robin Lopez (24)
| Lauri Markkanen (9)
| Zach LaVine (7)
| Talking Stick Resort Arena15,879
| 20–52
|- style="background:#cfc
| 73
| March 20
| Washington
| 126–120 (OT)
| Lauri Markkanen (32)
| Lauri Markkanen (13)
| Kris Dunn (13)
| United Center19,470
| 21–52
|- style="background:#fcc
| 74
| March 23
| Utah
| 83–114
| Lauri Markkanen (18)
| Lauri Markkanen (10)
| Kris Dunn (5)
| United Center20,506
| 21–53
|- style="background:#fcc
| 75
| March 26
| @ Toronto
| 103–112
| Wayne Selden (20)
| Lauri Markkanen (9)
| Shaquille Harrison (5)
| Scotiabank Arena19,800
| 21–54
|- style="background:#fcc
| 76
| March 27
| Portland
| 98–118
| Shaquille Harrison (21)
| Wayne Selden (12)
| Lopez, Blakeney, Selden (4)
| United Center20,506
| 21–55
|- style="background:#fcc
| 77
| March 30
| Toronto
| 101–124
| Walt Lemon (19)
| Timothe Luwawu-Cabarrot (10)
| Walt Lemon (6)
| United Center21,238
| 21–56

|- style="background:#fcc
| 78
| April 1
| @ New York
| 105–113
| Robin Lopez (29)
| Shaquille Harrison (10)
| Lemon, Harrison (5)
| Madison Square Garden18,874
| 21–57
|- style="background:#cfc
| 79
| April 3
| @ Washington
| 115–114
| Walt Lemon (24)
| JaKarr Sampson (9)
| Walt Lemon (8)
| Capital One Arena16,616
| 22–57
|- style="background:#fcc
| 80
| April 6
| Philadelphia
| 96–116
| JaKarr Sampson (29)
| Sampson, Lemon (8)
| Walt Lemon (5)
| United Center21,059
| 22–58
|- style="background:#fcc
| 81
| April 9
| New York
| 86–96
| Ryan Arcidiacono (14)
| Sampson, Felicio (8)
| Arcidiacono, Harrison, Selden (3)
| United Center21,350
| 22–59
|- style="background:#fcc
| 82
| April 10
| @ Philadelphia
| 109–125
| Walt Lemon (20)
| Wayne Selden (8)
| Ryan Arcidiacono (6)
| Wells Fargo Center20,197
| 22–60

Injured

Player statistics

|-
| align="left"| || align="center"| SG
| 10 || 1 || 120 || 26 || 13 || 1 || 0 || 37
|-
| align="left"| || align="center"| PG
| style=";"|81 || 32 || 1,961 || 219 || 269 || 65 || 4 || 544
|-
| align="left"| || align="center"| SG
| 57 || 3 || 829 || 106 || 42 || 12 || 9 || 418
|-
| align="left"| || align="center"| C
| 44 || 44 || 1,110 || 307 || 78 || 26 || 58 || 455
|-
| align="left"| || align="center"| PG
| 46 || 44 || 1,389 || 187 || 277 || 68 || 21 || 519
|-
| align="left"| || align="center"| C
| 60 || 0 || 746 || 218 || 37 || 11 || 7 || 240
|-
| align="left"| || align="center"| PG
| 73 || 11 || 1,430 || 222 || 139 || style=";"|89 || 30 || 474
|-
| align="left"|† || align="center"| SG
| 38 || 38 || 1,325 || 169 || 85 || 67 || 21 || 440
|-
| align="left"| || align="center"| SF
| 44 || 14 || 895 || 185 || 34 || 23 || 6 || 229
|-
| align="left"| || align="center"| SG
| 63 || style=";"|62 || style=";"|2,171 || 294 || style=";"|283 || 60 || 26 || style=";"|1,492
|-
| align="left"|≠ || align="center"| PG
| 6 || 3 || 167 || 27 || 30 || 11 || 1 || 86
|-
| align="left"| || align="center"| C
| 74 || 36 || 1,606 || 286 || 89 || 11 || style=";"|78 || 704
|-
| align="left"|≠ || align="center"| SF
| 29 || 6 || 546 || 79 || 22 || 15 || 7 || 196
|-
| align="left"| || align="center"| PF
| 52 || 51 || 1,682 || style=";"|470 || 75 || 37 || 33 || 974
|-
| align="left"|† || align="center"| PF
| 39 || 17 || 1,042 || 241 || 84 || 23 || 14 || 556
|-
| align="left"|‡ || align="center"| PG
| 31 || 12 || 536 || 53 || 83 || 20 || 6 || 176
|-
| align="left"|≠ || align="center"| SF
| 15 || 15 || 492 || 83 || 40 || 18 || 9 || 262
|-
| align="left"|† || align="center"| PF
| 22 || 6 || 531 || 161 || 29 || 11 || 8 || 310
|-
| align="left"|≠ || align="center"| SG
| 14 || 2 || 214 || 16 || 10 || 8 || 3 || 71
|-
| align="left"|≠ || align="center"| SF
| 4 || 0 || 127 || 32 || 4 || 4 || 3 || 80
|-
| align="left"|≠ || align="center"| SG
| 43 || 13 || 984 || 136 || 73 || 23 || 7 || 342
|-
| align="left"|‡ || align="center"| PG
| 1 || 0 || 1 || 0 || 0 || 0 || 0 || 0
|}
After all games.
‡Waived during the season
†Traded during the season
≠Acquired during the season

Transactions

Trades

Free agency

Re-signed

Additions

Subtractions

References

2018–19
2018–19 NBA season by team
2018 in sports in Illinois
2019 in sports in Illinois
2010s in Chicago
Bulls
Bulls